Leslie Henry Harris (born 29 May 1955) is an English former footballer who played in the Football League for Barnsley.

References

1955 births
Living people
English footballers
Association football forwards
Barnsley F.C. players
Kiveton Park F.C. players
English Football League players